İskenderun Belediye Gençlik ve Spor is a football club located in İskenderun in Hatay, southern Turkey. The team competes in Hatay Amateur Leagues.

Previous names
 Kanatlıspor (??–??)
 Hatay Köy Hizmetlerispor (??–2005)
 Antakyaspor (2005–2008)
 İskenderun Belediye Sahil Spor (2008–2009)
 Karayılan Belediyespor (2009–2014)
 İskenderun Belediye Gençlik ve Spor (2014–2019)
 5 Temmuz İskenderunspor (2019–present)

League participations
TFF Third League: 2004–2008
Hatay Amateur Leagues: 2008–present

League performances

References

External links
İskenderun Belediye Gençlik ve Spor on TFF.org

 
Association football clubs established in 2005
Sport in İskenderun
Football clubs in Hatay
2005 establishments in Turkey